Culcitium is a genus of flowering plants belonging to the family Asteraceae.

Its native range is Western and Southern South America.

Species:

Culcitium albifolium 
Culcitium candidum 
Culcitium canescens 
Culcitium dasyphyllum 
Culcitium depressum 
Culcitium gilliesii 
Culcitium haenkei 
Culcitium herrerae 
Culcitium magellanicum 
Culcitium neaei 
Culcitium nivale 
Culcitium oligocephalum 
Culcitium peruvianum 
Culcitium pflanzii 
Culcitium rufescens 
Culcitium serratifolium 
Culcitium tenellum

References

Senecioneae
Asteraceae genera